Megachile australis is a species of bee in the family Megachilidae. It was described by Hippolyte Lucas in 1876.

References

Australis
Insects described in 1876